Stefan Friedmann (born 2 September 1941) is a Polish actor. He has made over 40 appearances in film and television. He starred in the 1978 comedy film What Will You Do When You Catch Me?, He hosted the Miss Polski pageant.

References

External links
 

1941 births
Living people
Polish male film actors
Male actors from Kraków
Beauty pageant hosts